The Killer Inside Me is a 1976 American neo-noir crime drama film directed by Burt Kennedy and based on Jim Thompson's novel of the same name. In this adaption, the action was shifted from the west Texas oilfields to a Montana mining town, and several other changes made. It stars Stacy Keach, Susan Tyrrell, and Tisha Sterling.

A 2010 remake was directed by Michael Winterbottom.

Plot
Beneath his likable exterior, Lou Ford, the sheriff of a small Texas town, is a sadistic sociopath with violent sexual tastes. When Lou gets involved with a local  prostitute's blackmail schemes,  the carefully crafted facade he maintains begins to unravel into a killing spree.

Cast
 Stacy Keach as Lou Ford
 Susan Tyrrell as Joyce Lakeland
 Tisha Sterling as Amy Stanton
 Keenan Wynn as Chester Conway
 Don Stroud as Elmer
 Charles McGraw as Howard Hendricks
 John Dehner as Bob Maples
 Pepe Serna as Johnny Lopez
 John Carradine as Dr. Jason Smith
 Royal Dano as Father
 Julie Adams as Mother

Remake

Michael Winterbottom directed a 2010 remake of the film starring Casey Affleck as Lou Ford, Jessica Alba as Joyce Lakeland, and Kate Hudson as Amy Stanton. The 2010 version contains more details about the history of Ford and his brother as well as a somewhat different ending.

References

External links
 
 

1976 films
1976 crime drama films
American crime drama films
Films directed by Burt Kennedy
Films based on American novels
Films based on thriller novels
Films set in Montana
American serial killer films
American neo-noir films
Warner Bros. films
1970s English-language films
1970s American films